The Tunnel is a British-French crime drama television series adapted from the 2011 Danish/Swedish crime series The Bridge (Broen/Bron). The series premiered on 16 October 2013 on Sky Atlantic in the United Kingdom, and on 11 November 2013 on Canal+ in France. The Tunnel stars Stephen Dillane and Clémence Poésy as British and French police detectives Karl Roebuck and Elise Wassermann, respectively. 

Series 1 follows the two detectives working together to find a serial killer who left the upper-half body of a French politician and the lower-half of a British prostitute in the Channel Tunnel, at the midpoint between France and the UK.

The renewal for a second series was announced on 15 February 2015. Titled The Tunnel: Sabotage, the series premiered on Canal+ on 7 March 2016, followed by Sky Atlantic on 12 April 2016 (the series was originally scheduled to debut in the UK on 5 April, but was delayed for a week due to the Brussels terrorist attacks on 22 March 2016). Series 2 focuses on the crash of an airliner into the English Channel.

The third and final series was announced on 20 January 2017. The Tunnel: Vengeance consists of six episodes. Series 3 premiered on Sky Atlantic on 14 December 2017, with all episodes released on the same day. The series premiered on Canal+ on 4 June 2018.

Series overview

Episodes

Series 1 (2013)

Series 2: Sabotage (2016)

Series 3: Vengeance (2017)

Notes

References

External links

 [https://web.archive.org/web/20131221232351/http://www.sky.com/tv/show/the-tunnel  The Tunnel] Series 1 at Sky Atlantic (archive)
  The Tunnel: Sabotage at Sky Atlantic
  The Tunnel at Canal+
 
 

Lists of British crime television series episodes
Lists of British drama television series episodes
Lists of French television series episodes